Greatest Hits is a compilation album by the Scottish hard rock band Nazareth, released in 1975.  By this time Nazareth had experienced considerable success with albums and singles.  This compilation showcased tracks from the band's third album Razamanaz through their sixth album Hair of the Dog, as well as some non-album singles.

As part of the remastering of Nazareth's back-catalogue by Castle Communications in the mid-1990s, the original album was expanded in 1996 to encompass the self-titled first album through to the ninth studio offering, Expect No Mercy, whilst retaining the original running-order of the vinyl release.

As part of the same CD-remastering programme, Greatest Hits Volume II was released in 1998, on CD only. This covered the later period of the band.

Track listing

1989 Vertigo CD Bonus Tracks

1996 Castle CD Bonus Tracks

 The 1996 remastered CD (Castle Communications ESMCD 369) added five bonus tracks listed above) and extensive booklet-notes, by Rob Corich (who did the remastering) and by McCafferty, Agnew and Sweet.

2010 Salvo CD Bonus Tracks

 The album was re-issued on CD in the UK again by Salvo Records in 2010. Again, the original running order was preserved with additional tracks added afterward to make the album a more comprehensive overview of the band's career. Two of these eight bonus tracks are from significantly later in the band's career, with "Dream On" coming from 1982's 2XS, and "Every Time It Rains" from 1991's No Jive.

Personnel
Dan McCafferty – vocals
Darrell Sweet – drums
Manny Charlton – guitar
Pete Agnew – bass guitar, guitar
Roger Glover – producer

Charts

Weekly charts

Year-end charts

Certifications

References

External links
Lyrics to songs from Greatest Hits

Nazareth (band) albums
1975 greatest hits albums
Albums produced by Roger Glover
A&M Records compilation albums
Vertigo Records compilation albums